D. formosa may refer to:

 Derwentia formosa, a plant endemic to Tasmania
 Dicentra formosa, a plant native to North America
 Dryandra formosa, a shrub endemic to Western Australia
 Dryomyza formosa, an Asian fly
 Dysstroma formosa, a geometer moth